Jameson Zvidzai Timba is the former Minister of State in the office of the Prime Minister of the Republic of Zimbabwe (2010 to 2013), the former Deputy Minister of Media, Information and Publicity  (2009-2010). He was the Member of House of Assembly for Mount Pleasant (MDC-T) (2008 to 2013). He was the Chief Political Advisor to the Prime Minister at the time and he assisted in discharging the constitutional mandate of overseeing the formulation of policy by cabinet and supervised its implementation by the entirety of government. Prior to this he had successfully pushed for the operationalization of an independent Media Commission and the opening up of the print media environment which was dominated by the state, leading to the registration of two independent daily newspapers to complement independent weekly newspapers. From 2004 to 2008, he was the chairman of the board of trustees of Arundel School and, from 2005, he was the chairman of the Association of Trust Schools (a grouping of all private schools in Zimbabwe).  During this period he successfully defended the right of independent schools to exist and operate without state interference by mounting ten lawsuits against the then Minister of Education without a single loss. He holds a Bachelor of Science in political science and a Master of Business Administration (MBA) from the University of Zimbabwe. In 2012, he was featured in an American documentary film on democracy A Whisper to a Roar by Ben Moses.

References

Members of the National Assembly of Zimbabwe
Alumni of Bernard Mizeki College
Living people
Year of birth missing (living people)

Movement for Democratic Change – Tsvangirai politicians
21st-century Zimbabwean politicians
Government ministers of Zimbabwe